The year 2014 is the 3rd year in the history of the Glory, an international kickboxing event. 2014 starts with Glory 14: Zagreb, and ends with Glory 18: Oklahoma. The events were broadcasts through television agreements with Spike TV and other regional channels around the world.

List of events

Glory 14: Zagreb

Glory 14: Zagreb was a kickboxing event held on March 8, 2014 at the Arena Zagreb in Zagreb, Croatia.

Background
This event featured heavyweight fight of Mirko Cro Cop vs. Remy Bonjasky as headliner, and world title fight for the inaugural Glory Lightweight Championship of Andy Ristie vs. Davit Kiria as co-headliner. This event also featured 4 men Middleweight Contender Tournament to earn a spot in 2014 Glory Middleweight World Championship Tournament.

Glory 14 had an average number of 495,000 viewers on Spike TV.

Results

1 Ky Hollenbeck was replaced with Davit Kiria.
2 Jamal Ben Saddik was replaced with Dmytro Bezus.
3 Shemsi Beqiri was replaced with Teo Mikelić.
4 Dino Belošević was replaced with Kirk Krouba.

2014 Glory Middleweight Contender Tournament bracket

Glory 15: Istanbul

Glory 15: Istanbul was a kickboxing event held on April 12, 2014 at the Ülker Sports Arena in Istanbul, Turkey.

Background
This event featured Glory Light Heavyweight World Championship Tournament for the inaugural Glory Light Heavyweight Championship. Two bouts was held as semi-finals. The winners of the semi-finals proceeded to the final bout for the tournament championship. This event also featured other non-tournament one-off bouts, the two headlines.

It had average of 354,000 and peak of 720,000 viewers on Spike TV.

Results

1 Brian Collette was replaced with Randy Blake.

2014 Glory Light Heavyweight World Championship Tournament bracket

Glory 16: Denver

Glory 16: Denver was a kickboxing event held on May 3, 2014 at the 1stBank Center in Broomfield, Colorado, USA.

Background
This event featured world title fight for the inaugural Glory Welterweight Championship of Karapet Karapetyan vs. Marc de Bonte as headliner, and 4-Man Heavyweight Contender Tournament.

It had average of 498,000 and peak of 815,000 viewers on Spike TV.

Results

1 Nieky Holzken was replaced with Karapet Karapetyan.

2014 Glory Heavyweight Contender Tournament bracket

Glory 17: Los Angeles

Glory 17: Los Angeles was a kickboxing event held on June 21, 2014 at The Forum in Inglewood, California, USA.

Background
This show was Glory's first Pay-per-view event. Main card of this event featured world title fight of Rico Verhoeven vs. Daniel Ghiță for the vacant Glory Heavyweight Championship, another world title fight of Marc de Bonte vs. Joseph Valtellini for the Glory Welterweight Championship, and 8-Man Glory Middleweight Last Man Standing Tournament for the inaugural Glory Middleweight Championship. Participants for middleweight tournament were Alex Pereira, Artem Levin, Bogdan Stoica, Filip Verlinden, Joe Schilling, Melvin Manhoef, Simon Marcus and Wayne Barrett.

On the preliminary card, a 4-Man Featherweight Contender Tournament and other one-off bouts were featured.

Mirko Cro Cop was first scheduled to face Pat Barry, and later Sergei Kharitonov on this card. However, on May 21, it was announced that Kharitonov had to withdraw from the fight due to injury. He was replaced by Jarrell Miller.

Miguel Torres was scheduled to make his GLORY debut as a participant of the Featherweight tournament. However, on May 28, it was revealed he pulled out of the tournament for undisclosed reasons. He was replaced by Marcus Vinicius.

Preliminary card had average of 487,000 viewers on Spike TV, and main card drew an estimated 6,000 PPV buys.

Results

 

1 Pat Barry was replaced with Sergei Kharitonov, and later Jarrell Miller.
2 Miguel Torres was replaced with Marcus Vinicius.

2014 Glory Middleweight Last Man Standing Tournament bracket

1 Extra round

2014 Glory Featherweight Contender Tournament bracket

Glory 18: Oklahoma

Glory 18: Oklahoma was a kickboxing event, held on November 7, 2014 at the Grand Casino Hotel Resort in Shawnee, Oklahoma, USA.

Background
This event featured world title fight for the Glory Lightweight Championship of Davit Kiria vs. Robin van Roosmalen as headliner and middleweight fight of Wayne Barrett vs. Jason Wilnis as co-headliner. Also this event featured 4-Man Light Heavyweight Contender Tournament, winner earns the right to fight for the Glory Light Heavyweight World Title. Additionally, the winner of the Benjamin Adegbuyi vs. Hesdy Gerges fight gets a heavyweight title shot.

It had average of 352,000 and peak of 648,000 viewers on Spike TV.

Results

1 Andrei Stoica was replaced with Artem Vakhitov.
1 Artem Vakhitov was replaced with Danyo Ilunga.

2014 Glory Light Heavyweight Contender Tournament bracket

References

Glory (kickboxing) events
2014 in kickboxing